The Winter Park Country Club and Golf Course is a historic site in Winter Park, Florida, United States. It is located at 761 Old England Avenue. On September 17, 1999, it was added to the U.S. National Register of Historic Places.  The golf course is a 9-hole, par 35 walking course that is 2470 yards long.

References

External links
 Orange County listings at National Register of Historic Places

National Register of Historic Places in Orange County, Florida
Buildings and structures in Winter Park, Florida
Golf clubs and courses in Florida
Sports venues on the National Register of Historic Places in Florida
Golf clubs and courses on the National Register of Historic Places